Motovilikhinsky City District is one of the seven city districts of the city of Perm in Perm Krai, Russia. Population:  It is the second most populous city district of Perm (after Sverdlovsky City District).

Geography
The city district is situated on both banks of the Kama River. Two other rivers flowing through it are the Iva and the Yegoshikha.

Economy
The city district is the location of the Joint Stock Venture Motovilikha Plants, a prominent metallurgical and military equipment manufacturer.

References

City districts of Perm, Russia